William II (1312 – 22 August 1338) was the third son of Frederick III of Sicily and Eleanor of Anjou. He inherited the Duchy of Athens after the death of his elder brother Manfred on 9 November 1317.

During his minority, his Greek possessions were governed by his illegitimate elder brother Alfonso Frederick, who in 1319 added the Duchy of Neopatria to the Catalan domains. In 1330, Alfonso returned from Greece and William ceded the counties of Malta and Gozo to him. Nicola Lanza replaced him in Greece.

In 1335, William married María Álvarez de Jérica, a descendant of Roger of Lauria, without papal dispensation, as both John XXII and Benedict XII wanted to check the power of Frederick his father. Two years later, his father willed him the Principality of Taranto, the county of Calatafimi, the honour of Monte Sant'Angelo, and various castles and lands in Noto, Spaccaforno, Capo Passero, and Avola when his mother, Eleanor, daughter of Charles II of Naples, died. She died in 1341, but William died first on 22 August 1338. He left his library to the Dominicans of Palermo and was buried in the cathedral there.

Ancestry

Notes

Sources
Fiske, H. Acta Aragonensia. Berlin-Leipzig, 1908.
Ghisalberti, Alberto M. Dizionario Biografico degli Italiani: III Ammirato – Arcoleo. Rome, 1961.

1312 births
1338 deaths
Dukes of Athens
House of Barcelona (Sicily)
Burials at Palermo Cathedral
14th-century Sicilian people
14th-century Italian nobility
Counts of Malta
Sons of kings